Longfield Academy (formerly Longfield Comprehensive School) is a coeducational secondary school located in Darlington, County Durham, England.

Previously a community school administered by Darlington Borough Council, Longfield School converted to academy status in August 2011 and was renamed Longfield Academy. However, the school continues to coordinate with Darlington Borough Council for admissions.

Longfield Academy offers GCSEs and BTECs as programmes of study for pupils. The school also has a specialism in sports and offers its sports facilities for use by the local community.

References

External links
Longfield Academy official website

Secondary schools in the Borough of Darlington
Academies in the Borough of Darlington
Schools in Darlington